Anwar Ali may refer to:
Anwar Ali (actor), Indian actor and producer
Anwar Ali (banker), Pakistani economist
Anwar Ali (cricketer), Pakistani international cricketer
Anwar Ali (footballer, born 1984), Indian footballer
Anwar Ali (footballer, born 2000), Indian footballer
Anwar Ali (physicist) (born 1943), Pakistani physicist
Anwar Ali (poet) (born 1966), Indian poet, translator, and documentary film maker
Anwar Mohamed Ali (born 1971), Yemeni track and field sprint athlete
Ali Anwar (born 1954), Indian politician
Ali Anwar (writer) (?–2014), Bangladeshi writer